SNRPN upstream reading frame protein is a protein that in humans is encoded by the SNURF gene.

Function 

This gene encodes a highly basic protein localized to the nucleus. The evolutionarily constrained open reading frame is found on a bicistronic transcript which has a downstream ORF encoding the small nuclear ribonucleoprotein polypeptide N. The upstream coding region utilizes the first three exons of the transcript, a region that has been identified as an imprinting center. Multiple transcription initiation sites have been identified and extensive alternative splicing occurs in the 5' untranslated region but the full-length nature of these transcripts has not been determined. An alternate exon has been identified that substitutes for exon 4 and leads to a truncated, monocistronic transcript. Alternative splicing or deletion caused by a translocation event in the 5' untranslated region or coding region of this gene leads to Angelman syndrome or Prader-Willi syndrome due to parental imprint switch failure. The function of this protein is not yet known.

References

Further reading